Barsakelmes or Barsa-Kelmes or variation (Barsakelmes meaning "the place of no return"), may refer to:

 Barsa-Kelmes, a former island in the desertified defunct Aral Sea
 Barsa-Kelmes Nature Reserve, located on the former island
 Barsakelmes Lake, a lake located in the desertified Aral Sea basin, between the Western Aral Sea and Northern Aral Sea, in the northern part of the former Eastern Aral Sea
 Attulus barsakelmes (A. barsakelmes), a species of Kazahkstani spider

See also

 
 
 
 
 Kelme (disambiguation)
 Barsa (disambiguation)